The 1871 Truro by-election was held on 13 September 1871.  The byelection was fought when the incumbent Liberal MP, John Cranch Walker Vivian, resigned to become Permanent Under-Secretary of State for War.  It was won by the Conservative candidate James McGarel-Hogg. The Conservatives retained their gain at the 1874 UK general election.

References

1871 elections in the United Kingdom
1871 in England
19th century in Cornwall
Politics of Truro
By-elections to the Parliament of the United Kingdom in Cornish constituencies
September 1871 events